Denis Pidev (born 1 December 1992)  is a Bulgarian footballer who plays as a defender.

Career
On 8 July 2017, Pidev joined Third League club CSKA 1948.

Career statistics

Club

References

External links

1992 births
Living people
Bulgarian footballers
Association football defenders
First Professional Football League (Bulgaria) players
Second Professional Football League (Bulgaria) players
FC Chavdar Etropole players
PFC Marek Dupnitsa players
FC Vereya players
FC Montana players
FC Lokomotiv 1929 Sofia players